Louis Calabro (November 1, 1926 – October 21, 1991) was an Italian American orchestral composer.

Calabro studied piano and composition at Juilliard School of Music.  Vincent Persichetti was his principal teacher there.

Louis Calabro was a music professor at Bennington College of Vermont from 1955 until his death in 1991. He was a composer, teacher, conductor and a percussionist. Calabro's original music is published by Elkan-Vogel, Theodore Presser, Tuba Press and Morningstar Music. Calabro has over 100 works to his credit including music for traditional and non-traditional chamber combinations as well as for both large and small orchestral ensembles most notably in America. Calabro believed in writing music for those he knew best and had the distinction of hearing virtually everything he wrote performed during his lifetime. There are many recordings of these performances as well as scores archived at Bennington College and at the University of Vermont.

Louis Calabro founded the Sage City Symphony in 1972, an ambitious community orchestra in southwestern Vermont which is still active and continues to commission new works. Calabro believed strongly in encouraging and promoting contemporary music, at a time when few American orchestras (professional or amateur) were performing premieres.  With the Symphony, he commissioned dozens of new orchestral works and conducted their premieres. Composers whose work was premiered under his baton include Marta Ptaszynska and Vivian Fine.

He was a recipient of numerous awards including two Guggenheim Fellowships and two Elizabeth Coolidge Chamber Music Awards, plus grants from the National Endowment on the Arts and the Bicentennial Commission, and the Vermont Governor's Award for Excellence in the Arts (1992).

Complete works

Trio for Clarinet, Cello and Piano, in three movements (1949) Opus 1
Four Cinquains, song cycle for mezzo-soprano and piano, poems by Adelaide Crapsey. (1950) Opus 2
Concerto Grosso for String Orchestra, in three movements (1950) Opus 3
Three Vocializes, for mezzo-soprano and piano (1951) Opus 4
Statement for Orchestra, in one movement. (1951) Opus 5
Three Songs for medium voice and piano, poems by James Joyce (1952) Opus 6
Sonatina for Piano, in three movements (1952) Opus 7, published by Elkan Vogel
Trio for Violin, Cello, and Piano in one movement (1952) Opus 8
Concerto for Piano and Orchestra in three movements (1953) Opus 9
Sonata for Violin and Piano in one movement (1953) Opus 10 (commissioned by Max Polikoff)
Divertimento for Woodwind Quintet (1954) Opus 11, published by Elkan Vogel
First String Quartet in three movements, (1954) Opus 12
First Piano Sonata in three movements (1954) Opus 13
Bodas de Sangre (Blood Wedding) for piano, violin, clarinet, cello, tympani and guitar (1955) Opus 14
Two Songs, for medium voice and piano, text; Autumn Dusk and Late October be Sara Teasdale (1955) Opus 15
Young People's Sonatine for piano in three movements, (1955) Opus 16, published by Elkan Vogel
Symphony No. 1 in one movement (1956) Opus 17
Cello Sonata, unaccompanied in three movements (1956) Opus 18
Moonshine, four-part choral work, poem by Howard Nemerov (1956) Opus 19
Suite of Seven for piano solo, (1956) Opus 20, publ. Elkan Vogel
Macabre Reflections, a cycle of six songs for mezzo-soprano and piano, poems by Howard Nemerov (1956), Opus 21, published by Elkan Vogel
Night Parable, a dance score for percussion (1956) Opus 22
Monologues for piano four hands (dance score) (1957) Opus 23
Symphony No. 2 for Strings in three movements (1957) Opus 24
Motet in 42 parts for chorus and brass, poem by Gerard Manley Hopkins (1957) Opus 25
Dynamogeny (Viola Sonata) for viola and piano, (1958) Opus 26 (commissioned by Walter Trampler)
Ceremonial March for brass and percussion (1958) Opus 27, published by Elkan Vogel
Co-Instances, Music Without Order, for piano, cello, violin, and clarinet, optional French horn part (1958) Opus 28
Metaphors for 50-part chorus, poem by Wallace Stevens (1959) Opus 29
Rain Has Fallen, four-part women’s chorus a cappella, poem by James Joyce (1959) Opus 30 commissioned by the Philadelphia Art Alliance
Ten Short Pieces for Strings, (1961) Opus 31, published by Elkan Vogel
Symphony No. 3 in one movement, for full orchestra (1962) Opus 32 available rental from Elkan Vogel
Rondo for Solo Clarinet (1962) Opus 33
Five Duos for Clarinet and Cello (1962) Opus 34 Published by Elkan Vogel
Ten Pieces for Four Cellos (1964) Opus 35
Night Piece for Solo Clarinet (1964) Opus 36
Dadacantatadada, for blues singer and orchestra (1964) Opus 37
Cantilena, for soprano and string orchestra (1964) Opus 38, Publ. with piano reduction by Elkan Vogel, string parts on rental
Music for Drama (Hippolytus) (1964) Opus 39
Great Society (1965) Opus 40
Diversities for Piano (1966) Opus 41, Published Elkan Vogel
Epitaphs for full orchestra and chorus (1967) Opus 42
Piano Variations (1968) Opus 43, written for Douglas Nordli
O Clap Your Hands, after Psalm 47, a cappella chorus, SATB, (1968) Opus 44, commissioned by the North Bennington Congregational Church
Second String Quartet (1968) Opus 45, commissioned by Harpus College for the Lenox Quartet
The Child Sleeps, a cappella chorus (1968) Opus 46, published by Elkan Vogel
Environments for Twelve Brass and Solo Clarinet (1969) Opus 47, Recorded by CRI, on rental by Elkan Vogel
Latitude 15.09 N (Longitude 108.5 E) oratorio for full orchestra and chorus (1970) Recorded by Century, Opus 48
Motet for Paul, for four cellos, (1970) in memoriam Paul Boepple, Opus 49
Triple Concerto for Three Cellos and Orchestra (1971) Opus 50, for George Finckel
The Young Pianist's Concertino, for piano and strings, two piano reduction available (1972) commissioned by the Vermont Music Teachers Association Opus 51
Threnody for string orchestra (1973) Opus 52, in memoriam Leonard Rowe
Memoirs: Part One, for bassoon and percussion with narration, (1973) Opus 53, commissioned by Maurice Pachman. Recorded: Goldencrest Records
Alla Calabria, Con Amore, for voice and bongos, (1973) Opus 54, commissioned by Yasimin Aga Khan
Five for a Nickel Pie, five short intermediate pieces for piano solo (1973) Opus 55, Published by Elkan Vogel
Divertissement for solo piano, Opus 56, (1973)
Three Pieces for Solo Piccolo (1973) Opus 57, Published by Elkan Vogel
The Floods are Risen, for chorus SATB with two trumpets, two trombones, timpani, Biblical text (1973) Opus 58, commissioned by St. Stephens Church, Wilkes Barre, PA.
Voyage: A Bicentennial Piece for Orchestra and Chorus, text by Nicholas Delbanco, Supported by the Vermont Bicentennial Commission and a grant from the National Endowment on the Arts.  Recorded by Philo Records.  (1975) Opus 59
The Plight of the Humble Flea for solo marimba (1975) Opus 60
Invention for Band, commissioned by the Hartwick College Wind Ensemble, (1975) Opus 61
Lunarlied, for chorus and SATB and strings (1976) Opus 62, commissioned by the Ossining NY Choral Society
Rare Birds for solo flute, a cycle of twenty pieces with narrator commissioned by Sue Ann Kahn and the Jubal Trio, (1976) Opus 63
Kusehani, for twelve players, based on themes of the Alaskan Chilgit Indians, commissioned by Carol Beery Davis and the Alaskan Council on the Arts (1976) Opus 64
Ten Lyric Pieces for Flute Duo (1977) Opus 65, Published by Elkan Vogel
Let there be Joy, for chorus SATB (1977) Opus 65 A
Eos for English Horn and Strings (1977) Opus 66 written for Jennifer Graham
Epiphany for 13 cellos and two basses, in one movement (1978) Opus 67, commissioned by the Bennington Summer Cello Workshop
Chanterelle for French Horn and string quartet (1978) Opus 68, commissioned by the Composers Conference of the East, Published by Elkan Vogel with piano reduction, string parts on rental.
Finneganations, for piano solo, Opus 69 (1981)
William Wilson, an opera in three acts with libretto by John Gardner, Opus 70.  Begun in 1979, unfinished
Black Sky, for chorus and orchestra, text by John Gardner (1981) Opus 71
Missa Brevis for chorus SATB, strings (piano reduction for rehearsal (1983) Opus 72, written for the Bennington College Chorus Recorded 1984: Sage City Symphony
Isotrio, for viola, cello and bass, (1983) Opus 73
The Paradisa Bird for flute (piccolo), strings, mime, and narrator, text by the composer, (1983) Opus 74, Written for Andrew Bolotowsky
Five Clarinet Duos (1983) Opus 75
Five Promenades for piano four hands (1983) Opus 76
Dream, for soprano and piano, text by the composer, (1983) Opus 77
Oboe Duets (1983) Opus 78
Soap Opera for piano and narrator, (1983) Opus 79
Vermont Vignettes, eighteen pieces for voice and piano, text by the composer (1983) Opus 80
Cantata Lite, for chorus and piano, (1984) Opus 81
Isoquarto, for harp, viola, cello and bass (1984) Opus 82
Music for Folks for four cellos: 1985, Opus 83
Yucatán: Music for piano four hands: 1985 Opus 84, for Peter Calabro
Five Short Pieces for Piano Solo, 1985, Opus 85
Bass Duos, for string bass, 1985, Opus 86
Trio for Flute, Clarinet and Viola, 1985, Opus 87
Isoquinto, for woodwind quintet, 1986, Opus 88
Double Concerto for Viola and Cello with orchestra, 1986, Opus 89
Three Pieces for Two Pianos, 1986, Opus 90
Metamorphosis, for Twelve Flutes, 1986, Opus 91
Primavera, for piano and chorus, with children’s chorus, 1987, Opus 92
Max's Lullabye, for chorus and piano, 1987
Sonata Fantasia, for tuba and piano, 1987
Anniversary Overture, for orchestra, 1988
Antiphon Ritmico, for 8 celli, 1989
More Music for Folks, for four celli, 1989
10 Short Pieces for Violin and Viola, 1989, published by Elkan Vogel
Blue Rag, for piano, 1990
Fantasy, for piano, right hand, 1990
Sonata India, cello, piano, tabla, 1990
Variations, for solo viola, 1990
Young Peoples Variations, for piano, 1990
Child's Play, for children’s chorus and piano 1990, published by Morning Star
Infant Joy, for children’s chorus and piano 1990
"No!", for chorus, SATB, piano, 1990
Winter Solstice, for song, soprano, piano, 1990
Concert Piece for Piano Four Hands, 1991
Seven Deadly Modes, for chorus SATB, 1991 with piano or synthesizer
Kid's Stuff, for Children's Chorus, 1991
Three for Four, for four cellos, 1991
Canons for Two Equal Instruments, 1991
Fugue for String Orchestra, 1991
Hanon Sampler, piano and strings, 1991
In(ter)ventions, for timpani and piano  right hand, 1991
Petite Sonata, for young violinist, 1991
End of the Short, Short Story, chorus and piano, 1991
I, Why?, vocal duo, 1991

References

External links
 Louis Calabro's page at Theodore Presser Company

American male classical composers
American classical composers
American people of Italian descent
20th-century classical composers
Bennington College alumni
1926 births
1991 deaths
Musicians from Brooklyn
People from Bennington, Vermont
20th-century American composers
Classical musicians from New York (state)
20th-century American male musicians